John Constable Lee (1643 – 1673), the Oxford educated eldest son of London merchant and Virginia planter Richard Lee I accompanied his father on several of his voyages between London and its Virginia colony, as well as became a planter and official in Westmoreland County, including a term in the House of Burgesses shortly before his death.

Early and family life
Named after his paternal grandfather or uncle, John Lee was born near Tindall's Creek on the north side of the York River shortly after his newly married parents moved away from the Virginia colony's capital at Jamestown, and as an infant escaped with them from a major Native American raid in 1644 that killed many English settlers and their native allies. He grew up at his father's various newly established plantations in Virginia, then sailed to England to study at Oxford University in preparation to becoming a physician.

Career
However, after graduation he did not become a doctor, but instead assisted his father with the family's business interests, both mercantile and agricultural. John Lee probably accompanied his father on his last voyage to Virginia, where Richard Lee died on his Northumberland County plantation, after naming John Lee as his executor.

John Lee inherited three islands in Chesapeake Bay from his father, as well as the Machodoc plantation in Westmoreland County. In addition to operating the plantation (using his own, indentured and enslaved labor), Lee became an important person in Westmoreland County. He led its militia, including representing it on a joint committee with neighboring Northumberland and Stafford Counties to defend against Native American raids in 1666, and in 1673 he, Col. John Washington and others served on a commission to arrange the boundary line between Lancaster and Northumberland Counties. Lee also served as Westmoreland County's high sheriff at various times, as well as justice of the county court. Westmoreland County voters elected John Lee as one of the county's two delegates to the House of Burgesses in 1673, and he succeeded his younger brother Richard Lee II (who had served as one of the county's two delegates to the House of Burgesses in 1671 and 1672).

Death and legacy
John Lee never married, and died at his home later that year. Although Richard Lee II had only inherited property in Gloucester County from his father, after his brother John's death, he not only inherited his brother's significant library, but also assumed responsibility as their father's executor, as well as inherited the Machodoc plantation (to which he moved his family). Machodoc would burn down in 1729, but a historical marker notes its continued use as the Lee family cemetery.

References

1643 births
1673 deaths
People from Westmoreland County, Virginia
Lee family of Virginia
House of Burgesses members
American people of English descent
American planters
Virginia colonial people